Eduard Andrés Gutiérrez Castillo (9 August 1995 – 7 May 2017) was a Colombian professional footballer who played for Atlético Huila as a defender. He died in a road traffic accident at the age of 21.

Career statistics

References

1995 births
2017 deaths
Colombian footballers
Atlético Huila footballers
Categoría Primera A players
Association football defenders
Road incident deaths in Colombia
21st-century Colombian people